Shi zun is an ancient Chinese ritual bronze zun vessel, shaped like a boar, from the late Shang dynasty (1600–1046 BC). It was excavated in 1981 from Chuanxingshan, Xiangtan County, Hunan and now is preserved in the Hunan Museum.

Description

It is shaped like a wild boar with two tusks. It has an oval opening on the top and a hollow interior. Its whole body is decorated with patterns of scutes, clouds, dragons and animal faces.

Function
A zun is a kind of wine vessel. There are many theories about why it is made from bronze, including to exorcise evil spirits, to please the gods, or as a medium of communication between man and gods.

Discovery
In early 1981, Zhu Guiwu, a Hunanese villager from Chuanxingshan of Xiangtan County, discovered the Shi zun when he dug the foundation of his new house. It was identified by the cultural relics department as a Shang dynasty Chinese ritual bronze zun vessel.

References

External links

Further reading
 
 
 
 
 

History of Xiangtan
Shang dynasty bronzeware
1981 archaeological discoveries
Xiangtan County
Collections of the Hunan Museum